ISO/IEC 8859-4:1998, Information technology — 8-bit single-byte coded graphic character sets — Part 4: Latin alphabet No. 4, is part of the ISO/IEC 8859 series of ASCII-based standard character encodings, first edition published in 1988. It is informally referred to as Latin-4 or North European. It was designed to cover Estonian, Latvian, Lithuanian, Greenlandic, and Sámi. It has been largely superseded by ISO/IEC 8859-10 and Unicode. Microsoft has assigned code page 28594 a.k.a. Windows-28594 to ISO-8859-4 in Windows. IBM has assigned code page 914 (CCSID 914) to ISO 8859-4.

ISO-8859-4 is the IANA preferred charset name for this standard when supplemented with the C0 and C1 control codes from ISO/IEC 6429. ISO-IR 205 replaces the Currency Sign at 0xA4 with the Euro Sign.

Codepage layout
Differences from ISO-8859-1 have the Unicode code point below them.

References

External links
ISO/IEC 8859-4:1998
ISO/IEC 8859-4:1998 - 8-bit single-byte coded graphic character sets, Part 4: Latin alphabet No. 4 (draft dated February 12, 1998, published July 1, 1998)
Standard ECMA-94: 8-Bit Single Byte Coded Graphic Character Sets - Latin Alphabets No. 1 to No. 4 2nd edition (June 1986)
ISO-IR 110  Right-Hand Part of Latin Alphabet No.4 (February 1, 1986)
ISO-IR 205 Right-Hand Part of Latin Alphabet No.4 with Euro (February 1, 1986)

ISO/IEC 8859
Computer-related introductions in 1988